The 1961 NAIA football season was the sixth season of college football sponsored by the National Association of Intercollegiate Athletics. The season was played from August to December 1961, culminating in the sixth annual NAIA Football National Championship, played this year at Hughes Stadium in Sacramento, California. During its three years in Sacramento, the game was called the Camellia Bowl (separate from the present day bowl game with the same name in Montgomery, Alabama).

Pittsburg State defeated  in the championship game, 12–7, to win their second NAIA national title and first since 1957.

Conference standings

Postseason

See also
 1961 NCAA University Division football season
 1961 NCAA College Division football season

References

 
NAIA Football National Championship